Roy J. Harris (1902–1980) was an American journalist, an investigative reporter whose work was rewarded with the 1950 Pulitzer Prize for Public Service.

Journalism career
The 1950 Pulitzer Prize for Public Service was awarded "[f]or the work of George Thiem and Roy J. Harris, respectively, in exposing the presence of 37 Illinois newspapermen on an Illinois State payroll."

References

The Pulitzer Prize won by Roy J. Harris and George Thiem was chronicled in a book on the Public Service Pulitzer Prizes, "Pulitzer's Gold," by Harris's son, Roy J. Harris Jr. https://www.pulitzersgold.com/ An article about the connection between the two Harrises was published on the Pulitzer Prize website. https://www.pulitzer.org/article/life-pulitzers

American male journalists
University of Illinois alumni
1902 births
1980 deaths
Journalists from Illinois
20th-century American journalists